Dhirumeh Nethas is a Maldivian television mini-series developed for Television Maldives by Ahmed Nimal. Produced by Ahmed Shakeeb under Movie Maldives studio, the series stars Lufshan Shakeeb, Nashidha Mohamed and Niuma Mohamed in pivotal roles. The series was aired on 22 July 2012 on the occasion of 1433 Ramadan.

Cast 
 Lufshan Shakeeb as Nafiu
 Nashidha Mohamed as Azma
 Ahmed Nimal as Azma's father
 Ibrahim Jihad as Irufan
 Ali Fizam as Adil
 Nadhiya Hassan as Azma's friend
 Niuma Mohamed as Hudha
 Aminath Ameela as Noora

Episodes

Soundtrack

References

Serial drama television series
Maldivian television shows